Émilie Gavois-Kahn is a French actress.

Theater

Filmography

References

External links

French film actresses
21st-century French actresses
Actresses from Paris
Living people
1978 births